Viktor Hedlund  (27 May 1853 - 4 July 1922 in Helsinki) was a Finnish politician. He was a member of the Senate of Finland.

Finnish senators
1853 births
1922 deaths
Politicians from Helsinki